Counterpoint (also known as The Battle Horns or The General) is a 1968 epic war film starring Charlton Heston, Maximilian Schell, Kathryn Hays and Leslie Nielsen. It is based on the novel The General by Alan Sillitoe. In the United States the film was released as a double feature with Sergeant Ryker a 1963 television film starring Lee Marvin.

Plot
Lionel Evans is the director of a well-respected symphony orchestra touring European concert halls around 1944 in World War II. In the midst of one concert, the city where they are playing is attacked by German troops, and when Evans and his musicians try to escape, they are captured by Nazi soldiers led by Col. Arndt. Evans and the orchestra are taken to a castle where they are to bide their time before being executed; but it turns out that Arndt's superior, Gen. Schiller, is a big classical music fan. Schiller commands Evans and his symphony to prepare a special concert for the Nazis, but Evans realizes that the moment the concert is over, he and his musicians will be killed.

Cast

Charlton Heston as Lionel Evans
Maximilian Schell as Gen. Schiller
Kathryn Hays as Annabelle Rice
Leslie Nielsen as Victor Rice
Anton Diffring as Col. Arndt
Linden Chiles as Lt. Long
Peter Masterson as Sgt. Calloway
Curt Lowens as Capt. Klingermann
Neva Patterson as Dorothy
Cyril Delevanti as Tartzoff
Gregory Morton as Jordon

Music
The orchestra's performances, which include works by Tchaikovsky, Beethoven, Brahms, Wagner, and Schubert, were performed by the Los Angeles Philharmonic Orchestra.

Production
Filmed at Universal Studios including a set built for the 1923 film The Hunchback of Notre Dame, the film began shooting on 21 November 1966 and concluded 24 January 1967.  Two days were removed from the production schedule and the script was rewritten without consulting the director Ralph Nelson.

Translations
Also known as:

Denmark : Krigens symfoni
West Germany : Der Befehl
Greece : Nyhtes kolaseos
Finland : Sankareitten sinfonia
France : La Symphonie des héros
Italy : Sinfonia di guerra
Spain : Una tumba al amanecer
Sweden : I krigets järngrepp
Turkey : Esirler Kampı
USA (working title) : The Battle Horns 
USA (working title) : The General

See also
List of American films of 1968
List of American films of 1967

References

External links
 
 
 
 
 

1967 films
American war drama films
Films about classical music and musicians
Films directed by Ralph Nelson
Films scored by Bronisław Kaper
Films set in Belgium
Universal Pictures films
Western Front of World War II films
World War II films based on actual events
1960s English-language films
1960s American films